Gary M. Owen (born September 9, 1944) is a Democratic Michigan politician who served as a member and as Speaker of the Michigan House of Representatives. Upon his election, Owen was appointed to the House Appropriations Committee, the first-ever freshman appointed to that committee in history.

The main building for the Eastern Michigan University College of Business is named after Owen.

References

Living people
1944 births
Speakers of the Michigan House of Representatives
Democratic Party members of the Michigan House of Representatives
University of Michigan alumni
People from Lawrence County, Alabama
20th-century American politicians